Uhliská is a village and municipality in the Levice District in the Nitra Region of Slovakia.

History
In historical records the village was first mentioned in 1554.

Geography
The village lies at an altitude of 650 metres and covers an area of 14.098 km². It has a population of about 225 people.

Ethnicity
The village is about 99% Slovak and 1% Magyar.

Facilities
The village has a public library.

External links
http://www.statistics.sk/mosmis/eng/run.html

Villages and municipalities in Levice District